The Merchants Transportation Company was a shipping firm that operated on Puget Sound from 1905 to 1929.  This company should not be confused with the similarly named Merchants Transportation Company of Olympia, formed in 1874 and a completely separate firm.

Organization
Merchants Transportation Company was formed in 1905 by F.H. Marvin, A.W. Sterrett, F.H. Wilhelmi, and Capt. Robert McCullough, of Tacoma, and in that year purchased the steam freighter T.W. Lake from Puget Sound Navigation Co.  The company later acquired  the passenger steamboat Sentinel and Anna E. Fay, a former Yukon River steam tug which the company had rebuilt into the freighter A.W. Sterrett.

Course of business
The company was an early rival of the West Pass Transportation Company in competition for business along the route that ran from Tacoma to Seattle along a strait the west side of Vashon Island which was called the West Pass or Colvos Passage.  This was called the West Pass route.

Labor unrest
In 1907 a union movement was growing among the crews of Puget Sound steam vessels, particularly among the engineers, who had formed the Marine Engineers Beneficial Organization.  The shipping companies had scheduled a pay decrease to go into effect on January 10, 1907.  The engineering association determined to fight this, and threatened to strike.  In response, the shipping companies formed a formal association to negotiate with the engineers.  F.H. Marvin was the delegate from the Merchants Transportation Company, and was on the board of the directors of the company association and also on the committee to negotiate with the engineers.  Two days before the strike was to go into effect, an agreement was reached with the engineers to receive a 10% raise rather than a pay cut.

Ships owned by company
Vessels reported to have been owned by the company include A.W. Sterrett, Albion, Sentinel and T.W. Lake

Close of business 
In 1929, all Merchants Transportation Company boats went to Puget Sound Freight Lines.

Notes

References
 Findlay, Jean Cammon and Paterson, Robin, Mosquito Fleet of Southern Puget Sound, (2008) Arcadia Publishing 
 Newell, Gordon, ed. H.W. McCurdy Maritime History of the Pacific Northwest, Superior Publishing 1966.
 U.S. Dept. of Commerce, Bureau of Corporation, Report of the Commissioner of Corporations on Transportation by Water in the United States, (1909) (gives fleet compositions and corporate details, Pacific Coast inland companies start on page 236).

Ferry companies based in Washington (state)
Defunct shipping companies of the United States
Defunct companies based in Washington (state)
Steamboats of Washington (state)
1905 establishments in Washington (state)
1929 disestablishments in Washington (state)